Ramzan Sebiyev (born 26 October 1969) is a Russian boxer. He competed in the men's heavyweight event at the 1988 Summer Olympics.

References

1969 births
Living people
Russian male boxers
Olympic boxers of the Soviet Union
Boxers at the 1988 Summer Olympics
People from Grozny
Heavyweight boxers